Sørumsand Station is a railway station located at Sørumsand in Sørum  in Akershus, Norway.

History

The station is on Kongsvinger Line and is served hourly, with extra rush hour departures, by the Oslo Commuter Rail line R14 operated by Vy. In addition there are trains to Sweden operated by Vy Tåg on weekends. The station was opened as part of the Kongsvinger Line in 1892. In 1906 it became the terminal station of Urskog–Høland Line, though the latter line closed in 1961. Today there is a  heritage railway that operates from Sørumsand to Fossum.

References

Railway stations in Sørum
Railway stations on the Kongsvinger Line
Railway stations opened in 1892
1892 establishments in Norway